D D Thaisii is a politician from Poumai tribe of Manipur. He was elected from Karong Assembly constituency in 2007 and 2017 Manipur Legislative Assembly election and has served as Cabinet Minister in Manipur Legislative Assembly from 2007 to 2012.

References 

Living people
Indian National Congress politicians from Manipur
Manipur MLAs 2007–2012
Manipur MLAs 2017–2022
1962 births
Naga people